Darius Lukminas (born February 9, 1968) is a Lithuanian former basketball player for the Lithuanian National Basketball team and Žalgiris Kaunas. He was a shooting guard; his weight was listed as 90 kilograms and his height as 195 centimeters.

Professional career 
 1990-1996 - Žalgiris Kaunas
 1996-1998 - Avtodor Saratov
 1998-2001 - Atomerőmű SE
 2003-2006 - BC Gala Baku
 2006 - ASK Riga
 2006-2007 - Atletas Kaunas
 2007 - Sakalai Vilnius
 2009-2010 - KK Raseiniai

Awards and achievements 
 European championship Silver medalist - Eurobasket 1995
 Olympic Bronze medalist - Basketball at the 1996 Summer Olympics

References
 Short bio at LKL official webpage

1968 births
Living people
ASK Riga players
Lithuanian men's basketball players
BC Avtodor Saratov players
BC Žalgiris players
Olympic basketball players of Lithuania
Basketball players at the 1996 Summer Olympics
Olympic bronze medalists for Lithuania
Basketball players from Kaunas
Olympic medalists in basketball
Medalists at the 1996 Summer Olympics
1998 FIBA World Championship players
Shooting guards